Trust is an unincorporated community in Madison County, North Carolina, United States.  Centered at the intersection of NC 63 and NC 209, the community spreads along the adjacent Spring and Friezeland creeks, north of Luck.  The community is part of the Asheville Metropolitan Statistical Area.

The origin of the name "Trust" is obscure.

References

Unincorporated communities in Madison County, North Carolina
Unincorporated communities in North Carolina
Asheville metropolitan area